The Great Jubilee in 2000 was a major event in the Catholic Church, held from Christmas Eve (December 24) 1999 to Epiphany (January 6) 2001. Like other previous Jubilee years, it was a celebration of the mercy of God and forgiveness of sins.  The major innovation in this Jubilee was the addition of many "particular Jubilees" for various groups of persons, and that it was simultaneously celebrated in Rome, Israel, and elsewhere in the world.

Preparations
Preparation for the Great Jubilee began when Pope John Paul II issued his Apostolic Letter Tertio Millennio Adveniente (As the Third Millennium Approaches) on November 10, 1994. In the letter, he invited the Church to begin a three-year period of intensive preparation for the celebration of the third Christian millennium. The first year, 1997 would be marked by an exploration of the person of Jesus, the second, 1998, by meditation on the person of the Holy Spirit, and the third, 1999, by meditation on the person of God the Father. Each year was also to be marked by a special prayer of entrustment to the Blessed Virgin Mary.

The formal convocation of the holy year came through the papal bull of indiction, Incarnationis Mysterium (Mystery of the Incarnation), on November 29, 1998. In the bull, the Pope indicated that he had desired to lead the Church into the Great Jubilee since the beginning of his pontificate. He explained that this Jubilee would be a chance to open new horizons in preaching the Kingdom of God. However, it would also be a time of repentance, both for individuals and for the Church as a whole. Furthermore, he stressed the ecumenical character of this event, which he saw as not only for Catholics, but for all Christians and indeed for the whole world.

The various churches and cathedrals in Rome took advantage of the Jubilee to perform long-needed renovations. The facade of St. Peter's was under scaffolding for months, as centuries of grime were painstakingly removed. The Holy See also arranged to build a massive parking garage under the Janiculum hill, in order to accommodate all the buses that were expected. Construction of the garage was halted for some time due to the discovery of mosaics dating from the imperial period in previously unknown chambers under the hill. These were removed en masse so as to be able to complete the garage in time for the Jubilee.

Jubilee Indulgence
With the Bull of Indiction came a document from the Apostolic Penitentiary, indicating the conditions for receiving the Jubilee indulgence. In many respects, they were greatly simplified with respect to previous years. The normal conditions of confession, communion, prayer for the Pope and renunciation of attachment to sin remained in place, but unlike previous Jubilees, it was only necessary to visit a single church on a single day.

The indulgence could be obtained in Rome by visiting one of the four patriarchal basilicas, St. Peter's Basilica, St. John Lateran, St. Paul Outside the Walls or St. Mary Major, as well as by a visit to the shrine of Our Lady of Divine Love, the basilica of St. Lawrence Outside the Walls or the Christian catacombs of Rome. In the visit, the pilgrim had to take part in a religious celebration or spend a half-hour in Eucharistic adoration.

The indulgence could also be obtained in the Holy Land by a visit to the Church of the Holy Sepulchre in Jerusalem, the Church of the Nativity in Bethlehem, or the Church of the Annunciation in Nazareth.

Further, the Jubilee was extended to all dioceses of the world. A visit to the cathedral church or another shrine designated by the bishop would also suffice to gain the Jubilee indulgence. Cloistered nuns and monks could obtain the indulgence in their house chapels.

Finally, the indulgence could be gained by means of a personal sacrifice or works of charity. Specifically mentioned in the document were sacrifices such as giving up smoking or alcohol for at least one day or making a donation to help the poor.

Highpoints
The particular Jubilees punctuated each week of the year 2000. There were special Vespers services held every day at St. Peter's Basilica, often with participation by the Pope. Nearly every Sunday was dedicated to a special celebration of some sector of society. (See list at the end of this article.)

Some events of the Jubilee year were seen to be particularly significant, however.

Opening

The pope opened the Jubilee by opening the holy door of St. Peter's Basilica shortly before the Midnight Mass on December 24, 1999. Most of the time, the holy doors of the patriarchal Basilicas are cemented shut. On the occasion of a Jubilee year, the pope opens the doors as a symbol of opening the doors of grace. Pilgrims visiting the basilicas to gain the Jubilee indulgence enter the basilicas through these special doors. Throughout most of the Jubilee year, long lines were queued up to enter the door.

Pope John Paul II simplified the rite of opening considerably, compared to previous Jubilees. (See Holy door.) After a series of prayers and hymns, punctuated by African elephant tusks being blown, the Pope, clad in a purple cope, pushed on the doors as they were drawn open from inside by assistants. He then fell to his knees on the threshold of the Basilica and prayed, holding his silver Papal ferula. Pope John Paul II commissioned Patsy Ford Simms to compose the music for this celebration.

The holy door in St. John Lateran was opened by the pope the following day, and that of St. Mary Major on January 1, 2000.

Ecumenical Celebration at St. Paul's

The fourth holy door, that of St. Paul Outside the Walls, was not opened until January 18, 2000, to launch the week of prayer for Christian Unity. For that celebration, the Pope had planned an ecumenical service, inviting leaders of all Christian religions to take part. Twenty-two Christian leaders accepted the invitation, along with a representative of the World Council of Churches, which represents 337 denominations. The opening of the door was carried out simultaneously by the Pope, Metropolitan Athanasias, representing the Ecumenical Patriarch, and George Carey, Archbishop of Canterbury. All three fell to their knees on the threshold of the Basilica, joined in prayer. The liturgy of the day included readings from the Bible, from the Lutheran martyr Dietrich Bonhoeffer and from the Russian theologian Georges Florovsky.

Prayer for Forgiveness for Sins of the Church

One particularly rich ceremony of the Jubilee, dubbed the "Day of Forgiveness", came on March 12, 2000, the first Sunday of Lent. There the Pope begged forgiveness from God for the sins committed by members of the Church, and particularly sins committed in the name of the Church.

Seven senior curial officials read special prayers asking for forgiveness in specific areas. The first, Benin's Cardinal Bernardin Gantin, then dean of the College of Cardinals, made a general confession of Christians' sins in the course of history. Joseph Ratzinger, cardinal prefect of the Congregation for the Doctrine of the Faith, called for confession of faults for the use of "non-evangelical methods" in the service of faith, as for example, in the Inquisition. Roger Etchegaray, cardinal president of the Central Committee for the Jubilee, exhorted the confession of sins that caused division among Christians; Cardinal Edward Idris Cassidy, president of the Pontifical Council for Promoting Christian Unity, acknowledged the faults committed "against the people of the Covenant," the Jews; and Japanese Archbishop Stephen Fumio Hamao, president of the Pontifical Council for the Pastoral Care of Migrants and Itinerant People, mentioned sins committed against love, peace, the rights of peoples, respect of cultures and religions. Nigerian Cardinal Francis Arinze, president of the Pontifical Council for Interreligious Dialogue, requested confession of sins that have wounded the dignity of woman and the unity of mankind. Finally, Vietnamese Archbishop François Xavier Nguyên Van Thuân, president of the Pontifical Council for Justice and Peace, encouraged confession of sins in the area of fundamental rights of the human person: abuses against children, marginalisation of the poor, suppression of the unborn in the maternal womb or their use for experimentation.

This mea culpa of the Church was widely applauded, but some members of the Catholic Church felt that it had gone too far, and had damaged the doctrine that the Church is holy. For his part, at the prayer of the Angelus later in the day, the Pope indicated that such a ceremony was necessary. "The Holy Year is a time of purification: the Church is Holy because Christ is her Head and Spouse, the Spirit is her vivifying soul, and the Blessed Virgin and the saints are her most authentic expression. However, the children of the Church know the reality of sin, whose shadows are reflected in her, darkening her beauty. Because of this, the Church does not cease to implore God's forgiveness for the sins of her members."

Pilgrimage to the Holy Land
Only a few days later, from March 21 to March 26, the Pope realized a long-held dream by completing a personal pilgrimage to the Holy Land.  He visited Jordan, Israel and lands held by the Palestinian National Authority. Two particular high points of that visit were his prayer at the Western Wall, where he placed a copy of the prayer for forgiveness for sins against the Jews into a crack in the wall, and his celebration of the Mass in the Cenacle in Jerusalem.

The Cenacle had been closed to Pope Paul VI when he visited Jerusalem in 1964, because the same site is venerated in Judaism as the burial site of King David. Pope John Paul II was permitted to celebrate in this most holy location of Christianity, where he preached on the words spoken by the faithful after the consecration: "Christ has died, Christ has risen, Christ will come again". After the visit, the Israeli government arranged for the possession of the cenacle to be transferred to the Catholic Church in exchange for Santa María Blanca, a synagogue in Toledo, Spain that had been converted into a church.

World Youth Day

World Youth Day 2000 was an extremely well-attended event. An estimated two million youths took place in the closing Mass. The Roman subways were filled with singing youths from all over the world. The area around the Circus Maximus was converted into a large area for the hearing of confession. There were always long lines at these confessionals, and most priests in Rome spent several hours here. The event culminated with the Mass on August 20, 2000 in a large field belonging to the Roman university Tor Vergata.

Closing
The Great Jubilee was closed on January 6, 2001 with the Mass of Epiphany. On the previous night, the Basilica of St. Peter was scheduled to close at 6:00 p.m. but the church remained open until the last pilgrim had passed through the Holy Doors at about 2:20 a.m. on January 6. After solemnly closing the Holy Door, the Pope celebrated Mass in front of the basilica for a congregation of some 10,000 persons. On this occasion, the Pope signed his Apostolic Letter Novo Millennio Ineunte (At the beginning of the new millennium) which outlines the priorities of the Church for the 21st century and beyond.

The Jubilee beyond the Catholic Church 
The proposal to celebrate the year 2000 was received very well among Christians. Early on, the Vatican had a disappointment because the Waldenses, the only large Protestant religion in Italy, refused to participate because of their dispute against the Jubilee indulgence. Nonetheless, many Christians celebrated this year in a special way.

There were also various special efforts to bring light on social issues in this year. Noting that the Biblical Jubilees involved the forgiveness of debts, the rock singer Bono, Quincy Jones, Willie Colón, Muhammad Ali, Bob Geldof among others supported Jubilee 2000 to increase awareness of the developing nations struggling under a possibly unpayable foreign debt. With the blessing of the Pope, they sought to bring governments and international banks to cancel such debts during the Jubilee year.

The Italian group, Hands Off Cain (Nessuno tocchi Caino), took advantage of the Jubilee to call for an end to capital punishment around the world. Whenever a country chose to commute a sentence or abolish the death penalty entirely, the group illuminated the Roman Colosseum for various numbers of days. The Pope also called for a moratorium on executions and, if possible, the abolishment of the practice. On July 9, 2000, he visited the Regina Coeli prison in Rome.

List of Jubilee events presided by John Paul II
 December 24, 1999: Opening of the Holy Door, Basilica of St. Peter
 December 25, 1999: Opening of the Holy Door, Basilica of St. John Lateran
 January 1, 2000: Opening of the Holy Door, Basilica of St. Mary Major
 January 18, 2000: Opening of the Holy Door, Basilica of St. Paul Outside the Walls
 February 2, 2000: Jubilee of Consecrated Life
 February 11, 2000: Jubilee of the Sick and health care workers
 February 18, 2000: Jubilee of Artists
 February 19, 2000: Jubilee of Permanent Deacons
 February 22, 2000: Jubilee of the Roman Curia
 March 12, 2000: Day of Forgiveness
 March 19, 2000: Jubilee of Artisans
 April 16, 2000: Palm Sunday
 May 1, 2000: Jubilee of workers
 May 7, 2000: Commemoration of witnesses of the 20th century
 May 18, 2000: Jubilee of priests
 May 25, 2000: Jubilee of Scientists
May 28, 2000: Jubilee of Diocese of Rome
June 2, 2000: Jubilee of Migrants
June 4, 2000: Jubilee of Journalists
June 18-25, 2000: International Eucharistic Congress
June 22, 2000: Solemnity Corpus Christi
July 9, 2000: Jubilee in Prisons
August 15–20, 2000: World Youth Day
September 11, 2000: Jubilee of University World
September 15, 2000: Jubilee of Apostolic Nuncios
September 17, 2000: Jubilee of Senior Citizens
October 7–8, 2000: Jubilee of Bishops
October 14–15, 2000: Jubilee of Families
October 22, 2000: World Mission Sunday
October 29, 2000: Jubilee of the World of Sports
November 1, 2000: 50th Anniversary of the dogma of the Assumption of Mary
November 5, 2000: Jubilee of Statements and Politicians
November 12, 2000: Jubilee of Agricultural World
November 19, 2000: Jubilee of Armed Forces and Police
November 26, 2000: Jubilee of the Apostolate of the Laity
December 3, 2000: Jubilee of Communities with persons with a disability
December 10, 2000: Jubilee of Catechists and Teachers of religion
December 17, 2000: Jubilee of the Entertainment World
January 6, 2001: Closing of Holy Door at St. Peter's Basilica

Other events
Arvo Pärt was commissioned to compose a work for the occasion, and wrote  (Cecilia, Roman virgin) for mixed choir and orchestra. The Italian text deals with the life and martyrdom of Saint Cecilia, the patron saint of music. The work was first performed on 19 November 2000, close to her feast day on 22 November, by the Accademia Nazionale di Santa Cecilia conducted by Myung-whun Chung.

See also
Tertio Millennio Adveniente
Novo Millennio Ineunte
"Jubilee Song", an English-language Filipino song written to coincide with the Great Jubilee
New evangelization

References

External links

The Great Jubilee of the Year 2000
News of the Great Jubilee Year
The Holy See - Jubilee 2000

Jubilee (Christianity)
2000 in Christianity
Turn of the third millennium